Mali has one railroad (the Dakar–Niger Railway), including 729 kilometers in Mali, which runs from the port of Koulikoro via Bamako to the border with Senegal and continues on to Dakar. The Bamako-Dakar line, which has been described as dilapidated, was owned by a joint company established by Mali and Senegal in 1995, with the eventual goal of privatization. In 2003 the two countries sold a 25-year concession to run the rail line to a Canadian company, which has pledged to upgrade equipment and infrastructure.

The Malian portion of the railroad carried an estimated 536,000 tons of freight and 778,000 passengers in 1999. The track is in poor condition, and the line is closed frequently during the rainy season. The line is potentially significant because it links landlocked Mali to the port of Dakar, increasingly of interest for Malian exports in the face of the disruption of access to Abidjan, Côte d'Ivoire, as a result of civil conflict in that country beginning in late 2002. In the early 2000s, there also were plans to construct a new rail line between Bamako and Kouroussa and Kankan in Guinea.

As of 2013, passenger services in Mali were being offered three days between Bamako and Kayes via Kati and Diamou.

The portion of track between Bamako and Koulikoro has been out of service since at least 2005, and satellite imagery shows numerous bridge and roadbed washouts that would need to be repaired before it would be navigable once again.

Technical 

 Gauge: 
 Brakes: The railway uses vacuum brakes. 
 Couplers: Buffers and chain, European.  - see loco CC2286.
 Couplers: Norwegian for some vehicles from India.
 Axleload 15 tonnes

Railway links with adjacent countries 

  Algeria - no - potential break of gauge /
  Niger - no railways
  Burkina Faso - no - same gauge 
  Côte d'Ivoire - no - same gauge 
  Guinea - no - same gauge  also 
  Senegal - yes - same gauge 
  Mauritania - no - break of gauge /

Maps 
 UN Map

Transrail

Cities and Towns served by rail

Existing 

 Kidira, Senegal - Mali border
 Kayes, Mali
 Diamou, Mali
 Kita, Mali
 Kati, Mali
 Bamako - national capital

Proposed

Closed 

 Koulikoro - Former railhead and river port.

Charts 
 Length

References

See also
 Railway stations in Mali
 Transport in Mali
 West Africa Regional Rail Integration